English football clubs have entered European association football competitions (UEFA Champions League/European Cup, UEFA Europa League/UEFA Cup, UEFA Europa Conference League and the now defunct UEFA Intertoto Cup, Inter-Cities Fairs Cup and UEFA Cup Winners' Cup) since 1955, when Birmingham City and a London XI took part in the inaugural Inter-Cities Fairs Cup. English clubs have also taken part in the FIFA Club World Cup on six occasions and the Intercontinental Cup on six occasions. Tottenham Hotspur won the Cup Winners' Cup in 1963, becoming the first English team to win a major European trophy.

The European Cup began in 1955–56, but there was no English representative during that inaugural season as reigning champions Chelsea had been persuaded to withdraw by The Football League. The first English side to participate in the following edition was Manchester United, who were also the first English winners in 1968, ten years after their second entry into the cup had effectively ended when eight of their players died in the Munich air disaster when flying home from Belgrade after qualifying for the 1957–58 semi-final. Liverpool became the first English team to retain a major European trophy when they won the European Cup for the second time in 1978.

Prior to that, England had been pioneers in establishing international competitions, with the Sir Thomas Lipton Trophy, which was won by West Auckland when they defeated Italian side Juventus in 1909. English teams have participated in UEFA competitions every year save for the years between 1985–1990, when in the aftermath of the Heysel Stadium disaster, all English clubs were banned from Europe by UEFA; Liverpool, who had been playing at the Heysel Stadium against Juventus, were banned for six years, until 1991. Several teams have played in Europe while being outside the top flight, including more recently Birmingham City and Wigan Athletic.

Liverpool are the most successful English and British team internationally with fourteen honours, winning the European Cup six times, also a British record.

Who qualifies for UEFA competitions
From the 2021–22 season, the various permutations allow for a maximum of five English clubs to qualify for the UEFA Champions League, three for the UEFA Europa League and one for the UEFA Europa Conference League. From the 2018–19 season, the top four clubs in Europe's four highest ranked leagues qualify directly to the group stage. These nations are currently England, Germany, Italy, and Spain. The minimum quota is for four English clubs to qualify for the UEFA Champions League and two for the UEFA Europa League.

Wales-based clubs
Note that some Premier League clubs are not based in England. Because they are members of the Football Association of Wales (FAW), the question of which country clubs like Cardiff City and Swansea City should represent in European competitions has caused long-running discussions in UEFA. Despite being a member of the FAW, Swansea took up one of England's three available places in the UEFA Europa League in 2013–14, thanks to winning the League Cup in 2012–13. The right of Welsh clubs to take up such English places was in doubt until UEFA clarified the matter in March 2012.

Winners of European and worldwide competitions from England

European and World competition winners

Full European record for English league clubs
Note: Clubs in bold won the corresponding competition that season.

UEFA Champions League/European Cup
English clubs have won the competition fourteen times and been runners up on eleven occasions as of 2022.

Note: UEFA denotes qualified for the UEFA Cup/Europa League.

UEFA Cup/UEFA Europa League
English clubs have won the competition nine times and reached the final on eight other occasions (including 1972 and 2019 when both finalists were from England).

UEFA Europa Conference League

UEFA Super Cup
English clubs have won the competition nine times and taken part on ten other occasions (only two clubs qualify).

UEFA Cup Winners' Cup
English clubs won the competition eight times and reached the final on five other occasions.

Inter-Cities Fairs Cup
English clubs won the competition four times and reached the final on four other occasions.

UEFA Intertoto Cup

Performance summary by competition

European Cup and UEFA Champions League

The UEFA Champions League (previously known as the European Cup) is a seasonal club football competition organised by the Union of European Football Associations (UEFA) since 1955 for the most successful football clubs in Europe. The prize, the European Champion Clubs' Cup, is considered the most prestigious club trophy in the sport.

As of the end of the 2021–22 UEFA Champions League season, English clubs have fourteen European Cup wins. The most recent English win came in 2021 when Chelsea defeated Manchester City 1–0 at the Estádio do Dragão. A record five English clubs have won Europe's premier club competition: Liverpool six times, the first English team to retain the cup (1977, 1978, 1981, 1984, 2005 and 2019), Manchester United three times and the first English team to win the European Cup (1968, 1999 and 2008), Nottingham Forest twice, being the second English team to retain the European Cup (1979 and 1980), Chelsea twice (2012 and 2021) and Aston Villa once (1982). English clubs also hold the records for the most consecutive tournament victories by clubs from one country (six wins between 1977 and 1982 by Liverpool, Forest and Villa) as well as the most consecutive defeats in the final (four teams were runners-up once each between 2006 and 2009).

Wolves' formative steps
Wolverhampton Wanderers were a dominant English side in the 1950s, being  League champions three times (1953–54, 1957–58 and 1958–59), under the management of Stan Cullis. Wolves also finished League runners-up on five occasions, most recently in 1959–60. In 1954, before anyone had really expanded the borders of domestic football, after recently winning the first division for the first time Wolves thought they would test themselves against Hungarian giants Honved.

At the time, Honved had Ferenc Puskás, who was a star player on the world stage. The match was part of Wolves' series of 'floodlit friendlies' which turned out to be the spark that created the European Cup as it came to be known. Wolves won 3–2, playing under the rare sight of floodlights in England, and it attracted attention all over Europe. The game was also broadcast live on the BBC and would become possibly the moment that the European Cup was truly born.

Wolves had also beaten a Spartak Moscow side earlier in the series, and the Daily Mail crowned them 'champions of the world' after sinking the Hungarians. But Gabriel Hanon, editor of L'Equipe at the time, hit back, saying the English side needed to win in Budapest or Moscow before they could claim that title. Hanon was at Molineux for the match and enjoyed it so much he started a campaign to introduce a competition where Europe’s elite clubs would face off against each other regularly.

Early years: 1955–1967
As champions of The Football League in 1954–55, Chelsea were scheduled to become England's representatives in the inaugural European Champions' Cup competition, to be staged the following season. Indeed, they were drawn to face Swedish champions Djurgården in the first round. However, Chelsea were denied by the intervention of the Football League, in particular their secretary Alan Hardaker, who persuaded them to withdraw.

Instead, the 1955–56 league champions, Manchester United, became the first English club to compete in the new competition. They faced R.S.C. Anderlecht in the preliminary round, winning the first leg 2–0 away from home. Dennis Viollet scored the opening goal, the first for an English club in the European Cup, and he went on to become the tournament's top scorer that season, scoring nine goals. Four goals from Viollet and a hat-trick from Tommy Taylor helped United to achieve a 10–0 second leg victory as they progressed 12–0 on aggregate. United's first three home ties of the competition were played at Manchester City's Maine Road ground, since the floodlights at Old Trafford were still in the process of being installed and were not switched on until March 1957. After next eliminating Borussia Dortmund and Athletic Bilbao, United lost to holders Real Madrid in the semi-final, 5–3 on aggregate. They did retain their league title however, to ensure their place in the following season's European Cup.

Tottenham Hotspur reached the semi-finals of the 1961–62 tournament, but were knocked out by Benfica.

The next two seasons were less successful in terms of progress by English clubs. Ipswich Town began the 1962–63 competition with a 14–1 aggregate victory over Floriana (including a 10–0 second leg win), but lost in the first round to A.C. Milan, who went on to win the final at Wembley. A year later Everton were beaten by another Milan club, Internazionale, in the preliminary round.

Manchester United win at Wembley: 1967–1976

Leeds United centre forward Mick Jones was the top scorer in the 1969–70 tournament; his eight goals helped his club to reach the semi-final stage, where they lost to Celtic. Jones scored a hat-trick in Leeds' 10–0 first round first leg win over Lyn Oslo, a match in which his team mate Michael O'Grady had opened the scoring after just 35 seconds, at the time believed to be the fastest goal in European Cup history. In 1970–71, Everton reached the quarter-final, where they lost to Panathinaikos on the away goals rule. 
In the early rounds, Everton had won the competition's first ever penalty shootout when they eliminated Borussia Mönchengladbach.
Arsenal made their first European Cup appearance in 1971–72. They were knocked out in the quarter-finals by Ajax, who went on to win the second of three consecutive European Cups, while Arsenal would not feature in the competition for another twenty years. In 1975, Leeds United faced Bayern Munich, of Germany in the final of the tournament in Paris. The game emerged as one of the most controversial matches in football history as it transpired that match fixing played a part in the latter's 2-0 victory with both goals benefiting from dubious refereeing decisions. Leeds United supporters often sing at both home and away matches proclaiming themselves 'champions of Europe,' after feeling aggrieved by the injustice of that night.

Derby County returned to the competition in 1975–76, but this time were defeated at the second round stage by Real Madrid. A Charlie George hat-trick gave Derby a 4–1 first leg victory, but Madrid progressed thanks to a 5–1 extra time win in the second leg.

English domination: 1976–1984
Liverpool led the way with domination. Beating any team out in front of them, they were unstoppable. Whereas the early to mid-1970s had seen three successive European Cup victories each for Ajax and Bayern Munich, the competition was dominated by English clubs in the late 1970s and early 1980s. Between 1977 and 1982, English teams won a record six successive finals. The sequence began when Liverpool, managed by Bob Paisley, beat Borussia Mönchengladbach 3–1 in the 1977 European Cup Final, in what was striker Kevin Keegan's last game for the club. Keegan's replacement Kenny Dalglish scored the only goal of the 1978 final against Club Brugge as Liverpool became the first English club to retain the trophy. Meanwhile, Brian Clough's Nottingham Forest had succeeded Liverpool as English champions, and the two teams faced each other in the first round of the 1978–79 European Cup in the first meeting of two English clubs in the competition. Nottingham Forest won the tie on the way to reaching the final, where they beat Malmö 1–0. Forest was the third club to win the tournament at their first attempt, after Real Madrid in 1955–56 and Internazionale in 1963–64.

Liverpool was again eliminated in the first round in 1979–80, while Forest retained the trophy, beating Hamburg 1–0 in the final. The following season it was Nottingham Forest's turn to make a first round exit as Liverpool went all the way to the final, where they beat Real Madrid 1–0 to secure their third European Cup under Bob Paisley. Liverpool's Terry McDermott and Graeme Souness were the tournament's joint top scorers, alongside Bayern Munich's Karl-Heinz Rummenigge, with six goals apiece. Liverpool failed to retain the trophy on this occasion as they were beaten in the quarter-finals by CSKA Sofia in the 1981–82 competition. A sixth successive English victory was still achieved however, as Aston Villa, playing in the European Cup for the first time, beat Bayern Munich 1–0 in the final in Rotterdam. The run of victories by English clubs came to an end in 1982–83 when both Liverpool and Aston Villa went out at the quarter-final stage after losing to Widzew Łódź and Juventus respectively. In the 1983–84 competition, Liverpool once again reached the final, where they faced Roma in the latter's home stadium, the Stadio Olimpico. The match finished 1–1 after extra time and Liverpool won the subsequent penalty shootout (4–2) to lift their fourth European Cup. It was the first time that the final had been settled by spot kicks.

Heysel and its repercussions: 1984–1992
Liverpool's participation in the 1984–85 European Cup marked their ninth successive season in the competition. They again made it to the final, but lost out 1–0 to Juventus after Michel Platini scored a second-half penalty. 1985 was the year of the Heysel Stadium disaster, which led to all English clubs being banned from the European Cup.

In the 1991–92 season, Arsenal were the first team to represent England in the European Cup after English teams were allowed back in. Arsenal lost out over two legs in the second round to Benfica.

1990s: Champions League introduced

The 1992–93 season saw the competition rebranded as the UEFA Champions League, a move that formalised the mini-league format that had been introduced the previous year. After winning the inaugural Premier League title, Manchester United entered the Champions League in 1993–94, the first time in a quarter of a century that they had played in European football's leading club competition. United failed to reach the group stage however, losing out on away goals to Galatasaray following a 3–3 aggregate scoreline in their second round tie.

A further change to the competition occurred in 1994–95, when the first and second rounds were replaced by four mini-leagues of four teams each, with the top two teams in each group progressing to the quarter-finals. As one of eight seeded teams, Manchester United were given a bye directly to the group stage, but missed out on the quarter-finals after finishing third, behind Barcelona on goal difference. In 1995–96, Blackburn Rovers were England's Champions League representatives, but their campaign was not a successful one as they won just one of their six group games and failed to qualify for the latter stages.

Manchester United's return to the Champions League in 1996–97 was the first of 18 consecutive seasons in which Manchester United qualified to enter the competition. They progressed through the group stages for the first time and went on to reach the semi-final, losing to eventual winners Borussia Dortmund. United topped their mini-league in the following season's group stages, but were defeated by AS Monaco on away goals in the quarter-finals. Also representing England in 1997–98 were Newcastle United, after the runners-up from Europe's top eight leagues were allowed to enter for the first time. Newcastle successfully negotiated the second qualifying round, but could only finish third in their group, despite a victory over Barcelona in the opening group game.

2000s: rise to European dominance and subsequent decline
Premier League teams gradually improved their performance in the Champions League until a peak centred on the 2008 season, followed by a significant decline thereafter. They had no semi-finalists for the first four seasons (1993 to 1996). They then had four semi-finalists (Manchester United in 1997, 1999, and 2002, and Leeds United in 2001) over the next seven seasons (1997 to 2003), one of whom went on to become champions (Manchester United in 1999). They then had four semi-finalists (Chelsea in 2004 and 2005, Liverpool in 2005, and Arsenal in 2006) in the next three seasons (2004 to 2006), with Arsenal going on to be runners-up in 2006 and Liverpool winning in 2005.

They then peaked with nine semi-finalists (Chelsea, Manchester United and Liverpool in both 2007 and 2008, and Chelsea, Manchester United and Arsenal in 2009) in the next three seasons (2007 to 2009), with Liverpool (2007), Chelsea (2008), and Manchester United (2009) going on to be runners-up, and Manchester United going on to win an all-English final against Chelsea in 2008, a year in which none of the four English teams were eliminated by anybody except another English team. Around this time, then-UEFA president Michel Platini began to make statements which resulted in a widespread perception that he was anti-English, which some attributed to his alleged fear of English domination in European club competition.

However, this dominance did not produce a corresponding number of titles. At its most dominant, from 2007 to 2009, the Premier League had 75% (9 out of 12) of the semi-finalists, 67% (4 out of 6) of the finalists, 100% (3 out of 3) of the runners-up, but only 33% (1 out of 3) of the winners (Manchester United in 2008), with the other two titles going to Milan in 2007 and Barcelona in 2009. And English dominance did not last, with the Premier League managing only two semi-finalists (Manchester United in 2011, and Chelsea in 2012) over the next four seasons (2010 to 2013), although Manchester United went on to be runners-up in 2011, and Chelsea won in 2012. In 2013, no Premier League side reached the last eight for the first time since 1996 (in a time when England were only entitled to one Champions League place compared to 2013's four), only two (Manchester United and Arsenal) made it to the last 16, and Chelsea became the first defending champions to fail to make it past the group stage of the Champions League, although by finishing third in their group they did manage to qualify for the UEFA Europa League, which they went on to win.

At that time, it was noted that if the decline continued for long enough, it could in theory eventually deprive the Premier League of its entitlement to have four teams in the Champions League each year, which it has had since 2005, but the coefficient tables gave little cause for concern from an English perspective, as all England's relevant coefficients were ahead of fourth-placed Italy's, and this did not change until 2018, when the quotas were adjusted by UEFA to guarantee four Champions League places to each of the top four nations, with those clubs going into the Group stage directly rather than having to navigate qualifying rounds.

The downward trend was reversed in 2018–19, when all four Premier League entrants (including Liverpool, who had reached the 2018 final) progressed to the quarter-finals. Despite the general decline in the levels of success from what English clubs had enjoyed a decade earlier, and the consistent high levels for other nations, particularly Spain, England remains the only nation to have four of the last eight participants in the competition, with 2018–19 joining 2007–08 and 2008–09 in that regard (Liverpool and Manchester United were involved in all three campaigns). In addition, English sides sealed all of the final places in both UEFA competitions in that season.

English finalists in European Cup and UEFA Champions League 

Five English clubs have won either the European Cup or UEFA Champions League. Liverpool have won six times which is the most of any English club.

FIFA Club World Cup

The FIFA Club World Cup (or the FIFA Club World Championship, as it was originally called) has been won by English clubs three times (Manchester United in 2008, Liverpool in 2019 and Chelsea in 2021). Liverpool and Chelsea were also runners-up once each.

English clubs in the FIFA Club World Cup

Intercontinental Cup 

Before being supplanted by the FIFA Club World Cup, the now defunct Intercontinental Cup served as a de facto annual world club championship contested by the European and South American club champions. Manchester United won it in 1999, the only time an English team won. English clubs contested the cup on five other occasions (1968, 1980, 1981, 1982 and 1984), losing each time.

Additionally, English clubs have initially qualified for the Intercontinental Cup but withdrew from participation, namely Liverpool in 1977 and Nottingham Forest in 1979. Both berths were eventually taken by the respective European Cup losing finalists. Liverpool also qualified for the 1978 edition but they and opponents Boca Juniors declined to play each other, making it a no contest.

English clubs in the Intercontinental Cup

See also
 History of the European Cup and UEFA Champions League
 List of football matches between British clubs in UEFA competitions

References

European football clubs in international competitions
History of football in England